The 57th Guldbagge Awards ceremony, presented by the Swedish Film Institute, honoring the best Swedish films of 2021 and took place on 24 January 2022 at Cirkus in Stockholm. The ceremony was televised by SVT, and was hosted by television presenter Gina Dirawi.

Clara Sola won a leading five awards out of its leading nine nominations.

Winners and nominees 
The nominees for the 57th Guldbagge Awards were announced on 16 December 2021 at the Filmhuset, Stockholm, by the Swedish Film Institute.

Winners are listed first and highlighted in boldface.

Films with multiple nominations and awards

References

External links 
 

2021 in Swedish cinema
2021 film awards
Guldbagge Awards ceremonies
2020s in Stockholm